In mathematics, in the field of geometry, a polar space of rank n, or projective index , consists of a set P, conventionally called the set of points, together with certain subsets of P, called subspaces, that satisfy these axioms:

By definition, for each subspace the corresponding d is its dimension.
 The intersection of two subspaces is always a subspace.
 There are at least two disjoint subspaces of dimension .

It is possible to define and study a slightly bigger class of objects using only relationship between points and lines: a polar space is a partial linear space  (P,L), so that for each point p ∈ P and
each line l ∈ L, the set of points of l collinear to p, is either a singleton or the whole l.

Finite polar spaces (where P is a finite set) are also studied as combinatorial objects.

Generalized quadrangles

A polar space of rank two is a generalized quadrangle; in this case, in the latter definition, the set of points of a line ℓ collinear with a point p is the whole ℓ only if p ∈ ℓ. One recovers the former definition from the latter under the assumptions that lines have more than 2 points, points lie on more than 2 lines, and there exist a line ℓ and a point p not on ℓ so that p is collinear to all points of ℓ.

Finite classical polar spaces 
Let  be the projective space of dimension  over the finite field  and let  be a reflexive sesquilinear form or a quadratic form on the underlying vector space. The Witt index of the form is equal to the largest vector space dimension of the subspace contained in the polar space, and it is called the rank of the polar space.

Classification
Jacques Tits proved that a finite polar space of rank at least three, is always isomorphic with one of the three types of classical polar spaces given above. This leaves open only the problem of classifying the finite generalized quadrangles.

References

 .

Families of sets
Projective geometry